The 16th season of Law & Order premiered on NBC on September 21, 2005, and concluded on May 17, 2006. This is the second season that remained unchanged from the 15th season, where Elisabeth Rohm departed the series as Serena Southerlyn departs from the series after the episode "Ain't No Love", although Annie Parisse as Alexandra Borgia joins the semi regular, staring with "Fluency".

Cast and crew changes
Jesse L. Martin returned to his role of Detective Ed Green in the season premiere episode; he left at the end of the last season to act in the movie Rent. Mid-season, Law & Orders future on NBC was in the air, unknown if the show would be renewed or canceled after this season. Prior to the end of the season, Annie Parisse – who portrayed ADA Borgia – quit the series, wanting out of her contract. A show insider said to Fox News, "She saw the writing on the wall, they never treated her very well. They were always complaining about her hair. And they also thought she looked too young next to Sam Waterson (sic)." Parisse's ADA Alex Borgia was brutally killed off in the season finale episode "Invaders."

It was announced that Dennis Farina (Detective Joe Fontana) wished to depart the cast weeks after the previous season finale episode aired. At the time Farina wished to pursue other offers and projects being developed by his production company. Dick Wolf said in a statement that he respected Farina's decision and looked forward to working with him again. 

There were "a lot" of firings, including a portion of the camera crew. "None of the original writer-producers are there anymore," a source said to Fox News. "They've all been replaced by people from L.A. who don't get the show." Walon Green was show runner/executive producer this season with Nicholas Wootton, over Matthew Penn, and Peter Jankowski. Green stepped down as show runner/EP at the end of the season and Wootton took over in the 17th season.

Cast

Main
 Dennis Farina as Senior Detective Joe Fontana
 Jesse L. Martin as Junior Detective Ed Green
 S. Epatha Merkerson as Lieutenant Anita Van Buren
 Sam Waterston as Executive Assistant District Attorney Jack McCoy
 Annie Parisse as Assistant District Attorney Alexandra Borgia
 Fred Dalton Thompson as District Attorney Arthur Branch

Recurring
 Michael Imperioli as Detective Nick Falco
 Richard Brooks as Defence Attorney Paul Robinette
 Carolyn McCormick as Dr. Elizabeth Olivet

Departure of Dennis Farina, Michael Imperioli, and Annie Parisse
Dennis Farina and Annie Parisse, who played Joe Fontana and Alexandra Borgia, respectively, left the series at the end of the 16th season. Michael Imperioli, who played Nick Falco, made a guest appearance (his last in the franchise) in the episode "Hindsight."

Episodes

References

External links
Episode guide from NBC.com

16
2005 American television seasons
2006 American television seasons